Cubbon Park is a station on the Purple Line of the Namma Metro in Bangalore, India. It was opened to the public on 30 April 2016. The station is located a few metres away from one of the entrances to Cubbon Park.

History
The Cubbon Park metro station, like all other underground stations on the Purple Line, was built using the cut-and-cover method.

There was a proposal to build a 35 km line known as Bangalore High-Speed Rail Link, from Cubbon Road to the Bengaluru International Airport in Devanahalli, according to BMRCL sources. This proposal was later shelved.

Art
Cubbon Park permits artists and students to showcase their work at the station under a project called "Art in Transit". An art installation by Prathmi Mehta, a student of Srishti Institute of Art, Design and Technology, features a board with the question, "What makes Bangalore?" in English and Kannada. The board instructs the viewer to pick up a thread from the tray next to board, and place it on one of 36 options on the board. The options available include Cubbon Park, Kesari bath, Copper Road, Russell Market, Lalbagh, Manyata Tech Park, Lumbini Gardens, Bull Temple, Indiranagar, Vidhana Soudha, Kengeri drain, Set Dosa, Namma Metro, Electronics City, Bisi bele bath, Bellandur Lake, Gulmohar tree, MG Road, Sankey Tank, and Ragi mudde. As of April 2017, the most popular choices were Electronics City, Bisi bele bath and Cubbon Park.

Station layout

Entry/Exits

See also
Bangalore
Cubbon Park
List of Namma Metro stations
Transport in Karnataka
List of metro systems
List of rapid transit systems in India
Bangalore Metropolitan Transport Corporation

References

External links

 Bangalore Metro Rail Corporation Ltd. (Official site) 
 UrbanRail.Net – descriptions of all metro systems in the world, each with a schematic map showing all stations.

Namma Metro stations
Railway stations in India opened in 2016
2016 establishments in Karnataka